The great woodswallow (Artamus maximus), also known as the greater woodswallow, giant woodswallow or New Guinea woodswallow is a species of bird in the family Artamidae. In appearance the great woodswallow is very similar to the more widespread white-breasted woodswallow but can be distinguished by its darker black upper side plumage and by the presence of a semi-oval black patch below the throat.

Distribution and habitat
The great woodswallow occurs naturally in tropical moist montane forest, usually amongst clearings with dead trees, most typically dead emergents above the canopy of primary rainforest. Although the species has been known to be common ever since the first Western explorers of New Guinea, it has adapted very well to human manipulation of the landscape and is especially common near Highland towns such as Mount Hagen and Goroka. Unlike the Australian dusky woodswallow, great woodswallows do not reduce their body temperature on cool nights.

Behaviour and breeding
Like its smaller relatives, the great woodswallow is a fast-flying aerial insectivore feeding chiefly on large flying insects. It is generally regarded as the smallest bird in the world that habitually soars on updrafts over long distances, but it will also use its feet to manipulate its insect prey.

Great woodswallows are highly social, flying in flocks of up to twenty birds, and nomadic over their montane forest habitat. It is common for very close “knots” of the species to allopreen on small posts for up to ten minutes. They usually breed between August and December, and the nest is like other woodswallows: a flat platform of grass or twigs in a tree hole or stump, though higher above the ground than other species in the genus. Great woodswallows are cooperative breeders, with most young adults remaining for a number of years with their parents to raise young.

References

great woodswallow
Birds of New Guinea
great woodswallow
Taxonomy articles created by Polbot